The New York Etching Club, formally New York Etchers Club, was one of the earliest professional organization in America devoted to the medium of etching. Its founders were inspired by the Etching revival that had blossomed in France and England in the middle of the 19th century. The purpose of the club was to create and promote etchings that did not merely reproduce existing paintings, but were original creations of art in their own right.

History 
The first meeting of the New York Etchers Club took place in the studio of James David Smillie on May 2, 1877. An etching by Robert Swain Gifford was printed on a small press under the supervision of Leroy Milton Yale. Eventually, bi-monthly meetings moved to the studio of Henry Farrer where etchings were printed from a press that Farrer built.

Other important members of the New York Etching Club included Charles Adams Platt, Thomas Moran, Samuel Colman, Kruseman Van Elten, William Merritt Chase, Frederick Stuart Church, Stephen Parrish, Joseph Pennell, J. C. Nicoll, Charles Frederick William Mielatz, and Thomas Waterman Wood. For most members, etching was an important side-interest to their main occupation as painters. That was not the case, however, for Edith Loring Getchell and Mary Nimmo Moran, two other artists of note who were both primarily etchers.

The New York Etching Club held regular exhibitions through the early 1890s in which members and invited guests displayed their etchings for sale to the general public. From 1879 to 1881, works by members of the New York Etching Club were also featured in a periodical called The American Art Review. Published under the leadership of Sylvester Rosa Koehler, the first curator of prints at the Museum of Fine Arts, Boston, it further popularized etching as a medium and the New York Etching Club as a professional organization. The success of the New York Etching Club helped spawn similar organizations in other major American cities in the late 19th century.

See also 

 List of American print clubs
Etching revival
Etching

References

Etching
Organizations based in New York (state)
Professional associations based in the United States
Organizations established in 1877
1877 establishments in New York (state)
Arts organizations established in the 1870s